Lloyd Andrew Brown [Gimpy] (December 25, 1904 – January 14, 1974) was a professional baseball starting pitcher, who played in Major League Baseball (MLB) for five different teams between 1925 and 1940. He was born in Beeville, Texas.

Brown spent 30 years in professional baseball, including 12 major league seasons, but is best remembered as the pitcher who delivered the most home runs to Lou Gehrig, 15, including two grand slams. In between, Brown played or managed in Minor League Baseball (MiLB) during the same period and later became a respected scout.

Brown reached the big leagues in 1925 with the Brooklyn Robins, spending one year there, before moving to the Washington Senators (1928–32), St. Louis Browns (1933), Boston Red Sox (1933), Cleveland Indians (1934–37), and Philadelphia Phillies (1940). In between, he played or managed in the minor leagues during twelve seasons and later became a respected scout. Brown's most productive season came in 1930 for the poor-hitting Senators, when he posted career-best numbers with 16 wins, 15 complete games, and 258 innings pitched. In 1931, he won 15 games for Washington, collecting career-highs in earned run average (ERA) (3.20) and strikeouts (79), and again recorded 15 victories, in 1932.

As a hitter, Brown was above average. He posted a .192 batting average (106-for-552) with 54 runs, four home runs, 59 runs batted in (RBI), and 38 bases on balls in 404 games. Defensively, he recorded a .969 fielding percentage (which is 14 points higher than the league average at his position).

Brown later continued in MiLB, pitching from 1941 through 1953 and managing for ten teams between 1947 and 1960. Brown won 202 games during 20 minor league seasons and had a 407–544 record as a manager, in 11 seasons (1946–53, 1955–56, 1960).

On January 14, 1974, Brown died in Opa-locka, Florida, at the age of 69.

References

External links

Lloyd Brown at SABR (Baseball BioProject)

1904 births
1974 deaths
Albuquerque Dukes players
Anaheim Aces players
Ardmore Boomers players
Baltimore Orioles coaches
Baltimore Orioles scouts
Baseball players from Texas
Borger Gassers players
Boston Red Sox players
Brooklyn Robins players
Buffalo Bisons (minor league) players
Burlington Indians players (1947–1949)
Chattanooga Lookouts players
Cleveland Indians players
Cordele Orioles players
Fort Lauderdale Braves players
Globe-Miami Browns players
Major League Baseball pitchers
Memphis Chickasaws players
Miami Sun Sox players
Minor league baseball managers
Newark Bears (IL) players
Newnan Brownies players
Paris North Stars players
People from Beeville, Texas
Philadelphia Phillies players
Philadelphia Phillies scouts
Pittsfield Indians players
Seattle Pilots scouts
Seattle Rainiers players
Spartanburg Spartans players
St. Paul Saints (AA) players
Toronto Maple Leafs (International League) players
Tucson Cowboys players
Washington Senators (1901–1960) players
Washington Senators (1961–1971) scouts
Wichita Falls Spudders players
Williamsport Billies players
Thomson Orioles players